Isabel Alçada (born 29 May 1950) is a Portuguese writer and teacher. She is known for creating the Adventure series with Ana Maria Magalhães. She was also education minister in the XVIII Constitutional Government of Portugal.

Life
Alçada was born in Lisbon in 1950. She attended Lycée français Charles Lepierre and took her first degree in Philosophy in Lisbon where she married and had a daughter. She later obtained a Master's degree in Boston. Alçada has been an advisor on the education of history and a visiting professor at the school of education in Lisbon.

In 1982 she started writing books with Ana Maria Magalhães for children with An Adventure in the City and An Adventure in the Christmas Vacation. By 2009 they had created over 50 "Adventure" books which describe the adventures of two identical twins and their friends. Some of the books are part of the Portuguese National reading scheme and they have been adapted for television creating over 40 programmes between 2001 and 2006.

References

1950 births
Living people
People from Lisbon
20th-century Portuguese women writers
20th-century Portuguese writers
Education ministers of Portugal
Women government ministers of Portugal